Maoping is a town in and the county seat of Zigui County, Yichang in the western part of Hubei province, China. It is the county seat of Zigui County, and as such is labeled simply as "Zigui" or "Zigui County" on most less-detailed maps.

Geography
The town is located on the right (southern) bank of the Yangtze, just upstream of the Three Gorges Dam, and offers a good view of the upstream side of the dam, as well as of an accessory dam which blocks off a valley on the southern side of the river from being flooded by the reservoir.

Administrative Divisions
Four residential communities:
 Binhu, Xichu, Jusong, Danyang

Eighteen villages:
 Jingangcheng, Yinxingtuo, Changling, Chenjiachong, Jiuli, Yangguidian, Chenjiaba, Jiandong, Xikouping, Sixi, Qiaojiaping, Huaguoyuan, Yueliangbao, Luojia, Songshu'ao, Zhongbazi, Lanlingxi, Miaohe

Transportation
The town's passenger dock (Zigui Gang, i.e. the Port of Zigui) is served by most boats traveling the Yangtze between Yichang and Chongqing. The bus station is a hub of local travel within the county and adjacent areas, and has frequent service to Yichang as well.

References

Zigui County
Township-level divisions of Hubei